Stigmella nireae is a moth of the family Nepticulidae. It is only known from Hokkaido in Japan.

The larvae feed on Ulmus davidiana var. japonica. They mine the leaves of their host plant. The mine consists of a long and narrow gallery. It is much contorted and irregular. The frass is thin and is deposited in a linear fashion, occupying less than one fifth of the width of the mine, except in the first part, in which the frass occupies almost the whole width of the track.

External links
Japanese Species Of The Genus Stigmella (Nepticulidae: Lepidoptera)

Nepticulidae
Moths of Japan
Moths described in 1985